The 1959 Cleveland Browns season was the team's tenth season with the National Football League.
Future Hall of Fame running back Jim Brown rushed for 1,329 yards, leading the league for the third straight year, and 14 touchdowns.
QB Milt Plum, who was drafted by the Browns in the 1957 draft with Brown would emerge as a solid quarterback. The Browns had been looking for a replacement for Otto Graham ever since the Hall of Famer retired—for the second time—following the 1955 season. They finally found him when Plum, a second-round draft pick in 1957, threw for 14 TDs with just six interceptions. However, the Browns would finish just 7–5 in 1959,
the second in what would turn out to be a string of six straight seasons in which the Browns had decent to very good teams without qualifying for the postseason. The 7–5 record was also the second worst record since head coach Paul Brown's tenure with the team.

Exhibition Schedule

Regular Season Schedule

Standings

Personnel

Roster

Staff/coaches

References

External links 
 1959 Cleveland Browns at Pro Football Reference (profootballreference.com)
 1959 Cleveland Browns Statistics at jt-sw.com
 1959 Cleveland Browns Schedule at jt-sw.com
 1959 Cleveland Browns at DatabaseFootball.com  
 Season summary and stats at Cleveland Browns.com

Cleveland
Cleveland Browns seasons
Cleveland Browns